Katrina Krumpane (born 1 April 1980 in Krāslava, Latvia) is a Latvian soprano and professor in opera, concert and recitals.

Early life 
Katrina Krumpane studied singing, piano, and flute at the Daugavpils Music college (Daugavpils Mūzikas koledža) in Latvia. In 1998 she won her first International Vocal Competition "Alexandrovsky" in Belarus.

After making her debut in 2004 at the Komische Oper Berlin with The Four Note Opera composed by Tom Johnson she has been performing in many countries, including Germany, Switzerland, and South Korea.

Education 

In 2010 she graduated with distinction for her diploma in singing/music theatre at the Berlin University of the Arts (UdK) and was awarded the Master of Arts at the same school.

Performances 
She performed in both opera and theatres, including Die Fledermaus as Adele, The Marriage of Figaro as Susanna, Der Freischütz as Ännchen, La bohème as Musette, L'elisir d'amore as Adina, Rigoletto as Gilda, Don Giovanni as Zerlina, Les noces as Bride, L'occasione fa il ladro as Berenice,  as Marie, Die lustige Witwe as Valencienne.

In 2011 she recorded her first CD with musicians from Deutsche Oper Berlin with Lalla-Roukh composed by Gaspare Spontini and made her debut at the Berlin State Opera (Staatsoper Unter den Linden) with Cinderella composed by Ermanno Wolf-Ferrari as Hartwige.

Since 2012 she has been named as the main jury of the vocal competition in Latvia, Germany, and South Korea.

For five years she had been working as an Assistant Professor at Sungshin Women's University while also teaching the Masterclass at both Yonsei University and Chugye University of the Arts. Since March 2021 she started to work as a Visiting Professor at Kyung Hee University in Seoul, South Korea.

References

External links
Official website
: "Quando me'n vo", Seongnam Arts Center Concert Hall, January 2017

1980 births
Living people
People from Krāslava
Latvian operatic sopranos
21st-century Latvian women opera singers